The Women's team pursuit race of the 2011 World Single Distance Speed Skating Championships was held on March 13 at 15:30 local time.

Results

References

2011 World Single Distance Speed Skating Championships
World